The 1948–49 Romanian Hockey League season was the 19th season of the Romanian Hockey League. Three teams participated in the league, and Avintul IPEIL Miercurea Ciuc won the championship.

Regular season

External links
hochei.net

Romania
Romanian Hockey League seasons
1948–49 in Romanian ice hockey